Tsekone Ridge, also called Tsekone Peak and Black Knight Cone, is an isolated ridge on the Big Raven Plateau of the Tahltan Highland in northwestern British Columbia, Canada. It is located southeast of Telegraph Creek at the north side of Mount Edziza Provincial Park between Eve Cone and Mount Edziza.

History
The name of this ridge was officially adopted on January 2, 1980, after having been submitted by the Geological Survey of Canada. It is Tahltan in origin and translates to stone fire.

Geology
Tsekone Ridge is a subglacial mound that formed in the Pleistocene epoch when this area was buried beneath glacial ice during the last ice age. It is associated with the Mount Edziza volcanic complex which in turn forms part of the Northern Cordilleran Volcanic Province.

See also
 List of volcanoes in Canada
 List of Northern Cordilleran volcanoes
 Volcanism of Western Canada

References

External links

Mount Edziza volcanic complex
Ridges of British Columbia
Subglacial mounds of Canada
Pleistocene volcanoes
One-thousanders of British Columbia